Petar Cupać (born 1 February 1980) is a Croatian sailor. He competed at the 2008 and 2012 Summer Olympics in the 49er class.

Together with his teammates Pavle Kostov and Ivan Bulaja, he is a recipient of the Pierre de Coubertin medal. In the 2008 Summer Olympics they lent their boat to Danes Jonas Warrer and Martin Kirketerp whose mast had broken shortly before the start of their race. Warrer and Kirketerp went on to win a gold medal.

References

1980 births
Living people
Olympic sailors of Croatia
Croatian male sailors (sport)
Sailors at the 2004 Summer Olympics – 470
Sailors at the 2008 Summer Olympics – 49er
Sailors at the 2012 Summer Olympics – 49er
Recipients of the Pierre de Coubertin medal
Sailors at the 2016 Summer Olympics – 49er